The following is a list of licensed FM/AM radio stations in the city of Palermo, Italy sorted by frequency.

See also 
 List of radio stations in Italy
 List of radio stations in Rome
 List of radio stations in Naples

Palermo
Radio stations